The Felix Vallé House State Historic Site is a state-owned historic preserve comprising the Felix Vallé House and other early 19th-century buildings in Ste. Genevieve, Missouri. It is managed by the Missouri Department of Natural Resources.

The site offers tours of the Felix Vallé House, a Federal-style limestone structure built in 1818 by Jacob Phillipson, a Jewish merchant from Philadelphia, Pennsylvania, that in 1824 became the commercial outlet and home of Felix Vallé and Odile Pratte-Vallé. An authentically stocked mercantile store representing the firm of Menard & Vallé is on display. Other features of the house include original mantels and interior trim, early Empire furnishings, an exterior staircase leading to the second-floor bedrooms, and a garden with original brick and frame outbuildings.

The Bauvais-Amoureux House (1792), which is open seasonally, and the Dr. Benjamin Shaw House (1819) are also part of the historic site.

References

Further reading
Aron, Stephen, American Confluence: The Missouri Frontier from Borderland to Border State, Indiana University Press, 2009, .
Deposki, Richard, Images of America: Ste. Genevieve, Chicago, IL: Arcadia Publishing, 2008, .
Evans, Mark L., The Commandant’s Last Ride, Tucson, AZ: Patrice Press, 1998, .
Foster, Gerald, American Houses: A Field Guide to the Architecture of the Home, New York: Houghton Mifflin Co., 2004, .
Franzwa, Gregory M., The Story of Old Ste. Genevieve, Tucson: Patrice Press, 1998, .
Missouri Life Magazine, Lewis And Clark’s Journey Across Missouri, Booneville, MO: Missouri Life Magazine, 2003.
Naeger, Bill, Patti Naeger, and Mark Evans, Ste. Genevieve: A Leisurely Stroll through History. Ste. Genevieve, MO: Merchant Street Publishing, 1998, .
Peterson, Charles E., Colonial St. Louis: Building a Creole Capital, Tucson, AZ: Patrice Press, 2001, .
Schroeder, Walter A., Opening the Ozarks: A Historical Geography of Missouri’s Ste. Genevieve District, 1760–1830, Columbia, MO: University of Missouri Press, 2002, .
Stepenoff, Bonnie, From French Community to Missouri Town, Columbia, MO: University of Missouri Press, 2006, .
Wehmeyer, Janice C., Ste. Genevieve, MO: A Guided Tour Through the Past and Present, self-published: 1993

External links

Felix Vallé House State Historic Site Missouri Department of Natural Resources
Felix Vallé House State Historic Site Map Missouri Department of Natural Resources

Missouri State Historic Sites
Historic house museums in Missouri
Protected areas established in 1970
Museums in Ste. Genevieve County, Missouri
Industry museums in Missouri
Jews and Judaism in Missouri
French-Canadian culture in Missouri
French-American culture in Missouri
Missouri culture
French colonial architecture
1970 establishments in Missouri